Sibanthracite Group is Russia's largest producer of metallurgical coal and world leader in the production and export of high quality UHG anthracite. All coal companies of the Group are managed by Management Company "Sibanthracite", having its offices in Moscow.

History 
Sibanthracite Group was established in 2018. The Group includes the leading coal companies of Novosibirsk region: Siberian Anthracite and Open-Pit Mine Vostochny (both anthracite producers), and Open-Pit Mine Kiyzassky (a major T grade coal producer in the Kemerovo region.

The Group's strategy is growth through the development of new start-up projects: from obtaining a mining licence to the start of dynamic production. Open-Pit Mine Vostochny and Open-Pit Mine Kiyzassky illustrate this  strategy implementation.

At the moment Sibathracite  is developing the Sugodinsko-Ogodginskoe coal deposit, the largest one in the Far East region (Amur Region), of which the production began in 2020. In addition, The Group owns Sibantracite Kuzbass, which holds a license for the development of the Verkhnetishskoye coalfield in Kuzbass. Production will start in 2020.

Owners and management 
The production assets  of Sibanthracite Group are owned by Sibanthracite PLC registered in Cyprus, of which its sole shareholder is  ALLTECH. More than 86% of ALLTECH shares were controlled by Dmitry Bosov, chairman of the board of directors, who died in the night of May 6, 2020. 

From 2018 to 2020, Maxim Barsky was the company's CEO.

All companies of the group are managed by management company “Sibantracite”.

The chief executive officer of Sibanthracite Management Company is Sergey Melnikov.

Activity 
Sibanthracite Group's facilities are located in the Novosibirsk and the Kemerovo regions. The companies specialize in open-pit coal mining. In 2019, the production volume of Sibanthracite Group amounted to 23.7 million tons, of which UHG anthracite - 14.1 million tons, T grade coal (PCI) - 9.6 million tons. 98% of anthracite and 70% of metallurgical coal are exported, mainly to the Asian-Pacific Region.

In the Novosibirsk region, Sibantracite Group mines anthracite from the deposits of the Gorlovsky coal basin. Siberian Anthracite and Open-Pit Mine  Vostochny develop 3 open-cast mines: Kolyvansky, Gorlovsky, and Vostochny. The facilities include two washing plants, three loading terminals, and 40km of haul roads.

In the Kemerovo region, Open-Pit Mine Kiyzassky extracts both metallurgical and thermal coal. To transport coal, the company has built 30 km haul roads, Uglepogruzochnaya railway station and a modern  automated coal-loading terminal.

The Group's coal start-ups are known for their fast commissioning of new enterprises.

The development of the Open-Pit Mine Vostochnyy in the Novosibirsk region started in 2015 and the anthracite mining started in 2016. At the end of 2018, the production volume amounted to 6.4 million tons.

The Open-Pit Mine Kiyzassky in the Kemerovo region began production in 2014—just two years after obtaining the license in April, 2012. In November 2018, the company produced 30 million ton of coal. At the end of 2019, the production volume reached 9.6 million tons.

Another region of the Group's presence is the Amur Region. In 2020 coal mining started at the Sugodinsko-Ogodzhinskoye coalfield, of which resources are estimated at 1.5 billion tons. The design capacity is 20 million tons of coal per year.

In 2019, Sibanthracite Group started the implementation of the “Severomuisky Tunnel-2” construction project.

In 2019, according to the Forbes magazine, Sibanthracite Group ranked third place in the five most rapidly developing companies in Russia. In the RBC rating of the fastest growing companies, Sibanthracite is ranked 13th place. It is noteworthy that Sibanthracite was the only coal company in the magazine's rating.

Production

Performance Indicators 
 2016 - 14.1 million tons
 2017 - 21.3 million tons
 2018 - 24.1 million tons
 2019 - 23.7 million tons
 2020 - 24 million tons

Financial data 

Sibantracite Group's consolidated performance indicators according to IFRS for 2019: revenue reached 125.5 billion rubles. The total amount of taxes pain amounted to 7.7 billion rubles, with a tax on profit of 5.1 billion rubles.  The volume of investments counted 10.8 billion rubles.

The group companies  are among the leading taxpayers in the regions of operation.

According to the results of the first quarter of 2020, Siberian Anthracite and LLC Vostochny open pit were included in the list of the largest taxpayers of the Novosibirsk region.

Products 
Anthracite, mined at the Kolyvanskiy coal deposit in the Novosibirsk region possesses the best physical and chemical characteristics among all anthracites. It is classified as Ultra High Grade Anthracite (UHG). It has the highest carbon content for premium quality anthracites—over 92% and a low level of impurities, such as sulphur, phosphorus, nitrogen, etc. The main field of application is metallurgy. 

Application sectors: 80% - metallurgy, 10% - power industry, and 10% -chemical industry.

Corporate social activities 
Corporate social responsibility is an important area in the activities of Sibanthracite Group. The companies of The Group, carry out social and charitable programs in the region. Sibantracite supports and helps the development of the hockey movement in Novosibirsk region.

The Group is one of the founders and a permanent partner of the Novosibirks Siberia hockey club. 

Sibanthracite Group implements a comprehensive program to support education in the Novosibirsk Region.

With the support of the Government of the Novosibirsk Region, it is implementing a program for the training of personnel for the mining industry of the region, together with the Ministry of Education and five leading universities in the region. 

Siberian Anthracite is a partner of the Regional Educational Center for the Identification and Development of Talented Children Altair - the Siberian branch of the educational center Sirius. 

With the support of Sibanthracite in the Novosibirsk region, the federal educational project "Teacher for Russia" is being implemented since 2020. 

The Group implements a long-term social project in Kuzbass — the support of the Shors, a small indigenous ethnic group.

With support of Kiyzassky Opencast LLC, a textbook of the Shor language for the first grade has been prepared, which will enter schools in the Kemerovo region by September 1, 2020.

Sibantracite Group pays considerable attention to the environmental issues. Group companies implement environmental programme, which includes eco-monitoring in the regions of presence.

References

External links 

 
 Bloomberg Businessweek company overview

Coal companies of Russia
Energy companies established in 1974
Non-renewable resource companies established in 1974
Companies based in Novosibirsk